Garra theunensis is a species of ray-finned fish in the genus Garra from Laos.

References 

Garra
Fish described in 1998